USS Passaconaway is a name used more than once by the U.S. Navy:

 , a monitor built during the American Civil War.
 , a net laying ship built during World War II.

References 

United States Navy ship names